Asterella is a liverwort genus in the family Aytoniaceae.

Species 
A partial list of species includes:
 Asterella australis (Hook.f. & Taylor) Verd. ex G.A.M.Scott & J.A.Bradshaw
 Asterella bolanderi, the Bolander's asterella
 Asterella californica, the California asterella
 Asterella conocephala (Steph.) R.M.Schust.
 Asterella dioica  (Steph.) H.A.Mill.
 Asterella drummondii  (Hook.f. & Taylor) R.M.Schust. ex D.G.Long
 Asterella elegans, the elegant asterella
 Asterella gracilis, the graceful asterella
 Asterella lindenbergiana, the Lindenberg's asterella
 Asterella muelleri  (Gottsche ex Steph.) R.M.Schust.
 Asterella palmeri, the Palmer's asterella
 Asterella saccata
 Asterella setisquama  (Steph.) R.M.Schust.
 Asterella subplana  (Steph.) R.M.Schust.
 Asterella tasmanica  (Steph.) R.M.Schust.
 Asterella tenella (L.) P.Beauv.
 Asterella tenera  (Mitt.) R.M.Schust.
 Asterella tenerrima  (Steph.) H.A.Mill.
 Asterella whiteleggeana  (Steph.) R.M.Schust.

References

External links 

Aytoniaceae
Marchantiales genera